The racial and ethnic demographics of the United States have changed dramatically throughout its history.

Sources of data
During the American colonial period, British colonial officials conducted censuses in some of the Thirteen Colonies that included enumerations by race. In addition, tax lists and other reports provided additional data and information about the racial demographics of the Thirteen Colonies during this time period.

People have been enumerated by race in every United States census since the first one in 1790. Collection of data on race and ethnicity in the United States census has changed over time, including addition of new enumeration categories and changes in definitions of those categories.

Historical trends
By 1471, Portuguese navigators hoping to tap the fabled Saharan gold trade had reconnoitered the West African coast as far as the Niger Delta, and traded European commodities for local crafts as well as slaves, the latter which turned out to be highly lucrative. The black population was non-existent to European regions in 1610, but awareness increased rapidly after 1620 when forced slavery of Africans was implemented building the Atlantic slave trade in the 15th century in colonial areas, Caribbean islands which later became parts of the United States. By 1490, more than 3,000 slaves a year were transported to Portugal and Spain from Africa African Americans (Blacks) made up almost one-fifth of the United States population in 1790, but their percentage of the total U.S. population declined in almost every U.S. census until 1930. From at least 1790 until the start of World War I, the overwhelming majority (around ninety percent) of African Americans lived in the Southern United States. In addition, before 1865, the overwhelming majority of African Americans were slaves. The Great Migration throughout the 20th century (starting from World War I) resulted in more than six million African Americans leaving the Southern U.S. (especially rural areas) and moving to other parts of the United States (especially to urban areas) due to the greater economic/job opportunities, less anti-black violence/lynchings, and a smaller amount of segregation/discrimination there. Due to the Great Migration, many large cities outside of the former Confederacy (such as New York City, Chicago, Detroit, and Cleveland) experienced huge increases in the African American percentage of their total population.

Whites (including Non-Hispanic Whites) have historically made up the overwhelming majority (usually between eighty and ninety percent) of the total United States population. The United States historically had few Hispanics, Asians, and Native Americans, especially before the late 20th century. Most Asian Americans historically lived in the Western United States. The Hispanic and Asian population of the United States has rapidly increased in the late 20th and 21st centuries, and the African American percentage of the U.S. population is slowly increasing as well since reaching a low point of less than ten percent in 1930.

Historical data for all races and for Hispanic origin (1610–2020)

The United States census enumerated Whites and Blacks since 1790, Asians and Native Americans since 1860 (though all Native Americans in the U.S. were not enumerated until 1890), "some other race" since 1950, and "two or more races" since 2000. Mexicans were counted as White from 1790 to 1930, unless of apparent non-European extraction. Hispanics (as well as the Non-Hispanic White population) were enumerated since 1940 (with the exception of 1950 and 1960), but some estimates for the Hispanic (and Non-Hispanic White) population were made for certain years before 1940 (as well as for 1950 and 1960).

a These population estimates include a small number of Native Americans/Indians as part of the Black/Negro population throughout this time period (1610–1780).
b While all Native Americans in the United States were only counted as part of the (total) U.S. population since 1890, the U.S. Census Bureau previously either enumerated or made estimates of the non-taxed Native American population (which was not counted as a part of the U.S. population before 1890) for the 1860–1880 time period. The combined taxed and non-taxed Native American population in the United States was 339,421 in 1860, 313,712 in 1870, and 306,543 in 1880.
c Data on race from the 2000 and 2010 U.S. Censuses are not directly comparable with those from the 1990 census and previous censuses due, in large part, to giving respondents the option to report more than one race. This is also true of data from the 2020 census, which saw a large number of respondents who had previously only identified as one race identify as multiracial.

Population by race and age (census 2010)

 Some other race, two or more races and all other mixed people (about 5.3% Some other race (mainly Mestizo), 0.6% Black in combination, 0.55% Asian in combination, 0.25% American Indian or Alaska Native in combination, 2.4% Multiracial)

Population by race (estimates)

Black population (2000 and 2010)

Hispanic or Latino (Estimates)

Hispanic population (2000 and 2010)

Hispanic or Latino Population by Type of Origin and Race: 2010

Hispanic or Latino 2010–2017 (Estimates)

Asian 2000–2017 (Estimates)

Asian population (2000 and 2010)

Asian population pyramids (Census 2010)

 Only about 10% from these category are people from South Asia, rest are from East or Southeast Asia

American Indian and Alaska Native 2010–2017 (Estimates)

Native Hawaiian and Other Pacific Islander 2010–2017 (Estimates)

Immigration to the United States 
Immigration to the United States by region and country:

Cyprus was calculated in Europe. South Sudan was calculated in Sub-Saharan Africa.

Top 10 sending countries:

M.- Mexico, Ch.- China, I.- India, P.- Philippines, D.R.- Dominican Republic, Cu.- Cuba, V.- Vietnam, K.- Korea (South & North), Col.- Colombia, H. – Haiti, E.S. – El Salvador, J. – Jamaica, U- Ukraine, G. – Guatemala, R.- Russian Federation, N. – Nicaragua, B.-H. – Bosnia-Herzegovina, Can. – Canada, Ir – Iraq, Pa – Pakistan.

Americas:

* United States, Paraguay, Suriname, French Guiana, Bermuda, Anguilla, Antigua-Barbuda, Aruba, Barbados, British Virgin Islands, Cayman Islands, Guadeloupe, Martinique, Montserrat, Netherlands Antilles (and Curaçao), Saint Kitts-Nevis, Saint Vincent and the Grenadines, Turks and Caicos Islands and US Virgin Islands.

East and Southeast Asia:

North Africa and West/Central Asia:

* Bahrain, Oman, Qatar and Turkmenistan.

South Asia:

Sub-Saharan Africa:

* Djibouti, Madagascar, Malawi, Mauritius, Mozambique, Seychelles, Angola, Central African Republic, Chad, Equatorial Guinea, Gabon, São Tomé and Príncipe, Botswana, Lesotho, Namibia, Swaziland, Guinea-Bissau, Mauritania and Niger.

Europe:

* Czechoslovakia (former), Slovakia, Denmark, Estonia, Iceland, Latvia, Norway, Croatia, Malta, Montenegro, Serbia and Montenegro (former), Slovenia, Luxembourg and Monaco.

Australia and Oceania:

* New Caledonia, Papua New Guinea, Solomon Islands, Kiribati, Micronesia, Palau, American Samoa, French Polynesia, Marshall Islands, Samoa and Tonga.

Total percentage of U.S racial groups by U.S region, state and overall nationally

Non-Hispanic White population as a percentage of the total population by U.S. region and state (1940–2020)

Black population as a percentage of the total population by U.S. region and state (1790–2020) 
Many Southern U.S. states historically had African Americans compose 35% or more of their total population(s), with three of them (Louisiana, Mississippi, and South Carolina) even having an African American majority at certain periods in their history. In contrast, the African American percentage of the total population in other parts of the U.S. (outside of the South) was historically almost always in the single digits (0.0% to 9.9%). Even after the Great Migration, no or almost no U.S. state outside of the Southern U.S. has ever had an African American percentage of its total population be greater than 16%. The Black proportion has declined since the 1990s due to gentrification and expanding opportunities, with many Blacks moving to Texas, Georgia, Florida, and Maryland and others migrating to jobs in states of the New South in a reverse of the Great Migration.

Free Blacks as a percentage out of the total Black population by U.S. region and U.S. state between 1790 and 1860 
In 1865, all enslaved Blacks (African-Americans) in the United States were emancipated as a result of the Thirteenth Amendment. However, some U.S. states had previously emancipated some or all of their Black population. The table below shows the percentage of free Blacks as a percentage of the total Black population in various U.S. regions and U.S. states between 1790 and 1860 (the blank areas on the chart below mean that there is no data for those specific regions or states in those specific years).

a There were no Blacks at all—either free or enslaved—in South Dakota in 1860.

Native American population as a percentage of the total population by U.S. region and state (1890–2020) 
The census counted 248,000 Native Americans in 1890, 332,000 in 1930 and 334,000 in 1940, including those on and off reservations in the 48 states. Total spending on Native Americans averaged $38 million a year in the late 1920s, dropping to a low of $23 million in 1933, and returning to $38 million in 1940.

Mexican (1910–1930) and Hispanic/Latino (1940–2020) population as a percentage of the total population by U.S. region and state 
Historically, the U.S. states with the largest Mexican/Hispanic/Latino populations were primarily located in the Southwestern states, Texas, and Florida. However, the percentage of the Hispanic/Latino population has dramatically increased in many U.S. states both inside and outside the Southwest in recent decades.

aThere are other estimates on this page which are a little different. These estimates here come from the U.S. Census Bureau.

Asian and Pacific Islander population by U.S. region and state (1860–2020)

Projections from 2020 through to 2060
The U.S. Census Bureau has projected that the U.S. White non-Hispanic population will become a minority (that is, less than half of the total U.S. population) during the 2040s, resulting in a plurality. In December 2012, the U.S. Census Bureau projected that 2043 would be the year in which the U.S. would become a majority minority nation, with no single ethnic classification constituting a majority of the population.  By 2060, Hispanic Americans are projected to account for about one-third of the total U.S. population. The tables present Census Bureau "middle series" projections published in May 2013.

Vital statistics of racial and ethnic groups (since 1935)

Source: National Center for Health Statistics, Census Bureau Intercensal Estimates

White (including White Hispanic)

Average population and percentage of population figures shown are slightly higher than given Census Bureau data, due to the fact that the definition of "White" in this case includes, along with Non-Hispanic Whites and White Hispanics, Hispanics who identify as "Some Other Race", but are counted as White due to the option and category of "Some Other Race" alone often not being one in CDC demographic data.

White (non-Hispanic)
The natural increase is slightly smaller than shown for non-Hispanic whites and slightly different for non-Hispanic blacks because the birth figures shown refer to mothers of that race, not the children. Most non-white babies of non-Hispanic white mothers are either Hispanic or black, and non-Hispanic black mothers occasionally have Hispanic children. On the other hand, all children born to Hispanic mothers, even if the mothers are white Hispanic, are counted as Hispanic.

Black (non-Hispanic)

Asian (including of Hispanic origin) 

* The data from 2016 to 2021, exclude those of hispanic origin, and also births from the Pacific Islanders and Hawaiian.

American Indian and Alaskan Native (including of Hispanic origin) 

* The data from 2016 to 2019, exclude those of hispanic origin.

Pacific Islanders and Hawaiian

Hispanics (of all racial groups) 
Notes: Estimates for the population of each race by year (available starting in 2000) do not include multiracial individuals which have been "bridged" to the single-race categories for the purposes of calculating the birth and fertility rates.
New Hampshire did not start reporting Hispanic origin until 1993, and Oklahoma until 1991, so data from those states are excluded before then.

See also
Demographic history of the United States
Demographics of Hispanic and Latino Americans
Demographics of the United States
History of immigration to the United States (contains historical immigration data for the US, including the foreign-born percentage for the US and for each US state at every US Census year from 1850 and 2010)
Majority minority
Race and ethnicity in censuses
Race and ethnicity in the United States
Race and ethnicity in the United States Census

Notes

References

Demographics of the United States
History of the United States
Race in the United States